"Love Came to Me" is a song written by Dion DiMucci and John Falbo and performed by Dion featuring the Del-Satins.  The song was arranged by Glen Stuart.  It was featured on his 1963 album, Love Came to Me.

Chart performance 
"Love Came to Me" reached number 10 on the Billboard Hot 100 and number 24 on the R&B chart in 1962.

References

1962 songs
1962 singles
Songs written by Dion DiMucci
Dion DiMucci songs
Laurie Records singles